Photo: is a multi-operational photography platform founded in Johannesburg, South Africa by John Fleetwood in 2015.

Background 
Photo: promotes photography and the work of emerging and practicing Photographers, with the aim to encourage critical and experimental approaches/responses to the role of photography in our world, today. Central to its vision is the idea that photography can be a delicate tool for social change. The platform wants to encourage dialogue, exchange, critical engagement and participation through commissioning, producing and connecting photography projects and practitioners. Photo: continues to play a notable contributing role in curatorial and educational projects in South Africa, throughout the African continent and beyond.

Projects 

 democraSEE is an award and mentorship platform to develop and show important contemporary photography stories and content from the Southern African region that deal with social and political issues and imaginaries.
 Photography learning workshops held in Mindelo, Cabo Verde; Addis Ababa, Ethiopia; Nairobi, Kenya; Kinshasa, DRC and across South Africa.
 10:10 is an interaction and exchange format: 10 photographers present their work for peer and invited experts’ feedback. Set to create informal interaction, sharing ideas, testing new project ideas. Photo: ongoingly runs 10:10 projects in Johannesburg and Cape Town.
 10:X is a longer workshop format, to facilitate critical discussion and meaningful content production for contemporary photography practice with a focus on a particular socio-political and artistic issue. Invited participants include photographers and other professionals who operate within a specialist field. Like 10:Queer
 10:Queer is a collaborative platform to facilitate critical discussion and meaningful content production on queer practices in Southern Africa, now. Invited participants included photographers and other professionals who operate within a field of queer practice in Southern Africa.
 Survey of Photography Training and Learning Initiatives on the African Continent, a survey and mapping project for photography schools on the continent. This is an ongoing project.
 Photo: is the editor for the CLPA News, a newsletter for the Centres of Learning for Photography in Africa, a membership organisation for photography training institutions in Africa. 3 editions per annum were issued in 2017, 2018 and 2019 so far.
 The Regional Mentorship Programme engages about 10 emerging photographers.

Exhibitions 
"Five Photographers. A tribute to David Goldblatt: An exhibition of Alexia Webster, Jabulani Dhlamini, Mauro Vombe and Pierre Crocquet", shown in Johannesburg (2018), and in 2019 in Maputo, Mozambique; in Maseru, Lesotho; at the National Arts Festival in Makhanda and in Durban (Aug 2019). 

“Connected", Kinshasa, DRC, 2019, an exhibition of the work of the participants of the Photography Masterclass at the Academy of Fine Arts (Académie des Beaux-Arts).

“Amongst other things", Mindelo, Cabo Verde, 2019, an exhibition of the work of the 8 photographers who participated in the 2019 Catchupa Factory Residency for PALOP Photographers.

“Of traps and tropes", Tunisia, 2017, as part of the inaugural Kerkennah International Photography Festival with the work of Héla Ammar (Tunisia), Matt Kay (South Africa), Meghna Singh (India, South Africa) and Simon Gush (South Africa).

“Cities and Memory", Denmark, 2016, as part of the National Biennale for Photography in Denmark, Brandts presented collections from more than 20 photographers from the BRICS countries. Under the theme Cities and Memory, Brazilian, Russian, Indian, Chinese and South African photographers work was curated to reflect on some of these transitions. With the work of Lebohang Kganye, Jansen van Staden, Moss Moeng and Siphosihle Mkhwanazi.

References 

Photography websites
Culture of Johannesburg
2015 establishments in South Africa